Ghari Balab is a village in Rohtak district of Haryana, India. According to 2011 Census of India population of the village is 1,547.

References

Villages in Rohtak district